Piaseczny may refer to:

People
 Andrzej Piaseczny (born 1971) more commonly known as Piasek, is a Polish singer

Places
 Babiec Piaseczny, a village in the administrative district of Gmina Rościszewo
 Osiek Piaseczny, a village in the administrative district of Gmina Zawidz

See also
 Piaseczno (disambiguation)

Polish-language surnames